County Armagh (named after its county town, Armagh) is one of the six counties of Northern Ireland and one of the traditional thirty-two counties of Ireland. County Armagh is known as the "Orchard County" because of its many apple orchards. The county is part of the historic province of Ulster.

Etymology

Geography and features
From its highest point at Slieve Gullion, in the south of the county, Armagh's land falls away from its rugged south with Carrigatuke, Lislea and Camlough mountains, to rolling drumlin country in the middle and west of the county and finally flatlands in the north where rolling flats and small hills reach sea level at Lough Neagh.

County Armagh's boundary with Louth is marked by the rugged Ring of Gullion rising in the south of the county whilst much of its boundary with Monaghan and Down goes unnoticed with seamless continuance of drumlins and small lakes. The River Blackwater marks the border with County Tyrone and Lough Neagh otherwise marks out the county's northern boundary.

There are also a number of uninhabited islands in the county's section of Lough Neagh: Coney Island Flat, Croaghan Flat, Padian, Phil Roe's Flat and the Shallow Flat.

Climate
Despite lying in the east of Ireland, Armagh enjoys an oceanic climate strongly influenced by the Gulf Stream with damp mild winters, and temperate, wet summers. Overall temperatures rarely drop below freezing during daylight hours, though frost is not infrequent in the months November to February. Snow rarely lies for longer than a few hours even in the elevated south-east of the county. Summers are mild and wet and although with sunshine often interspersed with showers, daylight lasts for almost 18 hours during high-summer.

On 22 July 2021 the record for highest outside air temperature ever measured in Northern Ireland was set in Armagh City when a reading of 31.4° Celsius was registered at Armagh Observatory's weather station.

History

Ancient Armagh was the territory of the Ulaid (also known as Voluntii, Ultonians, Ulidians, Ulstermen) before the fourth century AD. It was ruled by the Red Branch, whose capital was Emain Macha (or Navan Fort) near Armagh. The site, and subsequently the city, were named after the goddess Macha. The Red Branch play an important role in the Ulster Cycle, as well as the Cattle Raid of Cooley. However, they were eventually driven out of the area by the Three Collas, who invaded in the 4th century and held power until the 12th. The Clan Colla ruled the area known as Airghialla or Oriel for these 800 years.

The chief Irish clans of the county were descendants of the Collas, the O'Hanlons and Mac Cana, and the Uí Néill, the O'Neills of Fews. Armagh was divided into several baronies: Armagh was held by the O'Rogans, Lower Fews was held by O'Neill of the Fews, and Upper Fews were under governance of the O'Larkins, who were later displaced by the MacCanns. Oneilland East was the territory of the O'Garveys, who were also displaced by the MacCanns. Oneilland West, like Oneilland East, was once O'Neill territory, until it was then held by the MacCanns, who were Lords of Clanbrassil. Upper and Lower Orior were O'Hanlon territory. Tiranny was ruled by Ronaghan. Miscellaneous tracts of land were ruled by O'Kelaghan. The area around the base of Slieve Gullion near Newry also became home to a large number of the Clan McGuinness as they were dispossessed of hereditary lands held in the County Down.

Armagh was the seat of St. Patrick, and the Catholic Church continues to be his see. County Armagh is presently one of four counties of Northern Ireland to have a majority of the population from a Catholic background, according to the 2011 census.

During the 17th and 18th centuries, County Armagh was a major center of guerrilla warfare, cattle raiding, and brigandage by local Rapparees; including Count Redmond O'Hanlon, Cormacke Raver O'Murphy, and Séamus Mór Mac Murchaidh.

The Troubles

The southern part of the county has been a stronghold of support for the IRA, earning it the nickname "Bandit Country". South Armagh is predominantly nationalist, with much of the population being opposed to any form of British presence, especially that of a military nature. The most prominent opposition to British rule was the Provisional IRA South Armagh Brigade.

On 10 March 2009, the CIRA claimed responsibility for the fatal shooting of a PSNI officer in Craigavon, County Armagh—the first police fatality in Northern Ireland since 1998. The officer was fatally shot by a sniper as he and a colleague investigated "suspicious activity" at a house nearby when a window was smashed by youths causing the occupant to phone the police. The PSNI officers responded to the emergency call, giving a CIRA sniper the chance to shoot and kill officer Stephen Carroll.

Administration
The county was administered by Armagh County Council from 1899 until the abolition of county councils in Northern Ireland in 1973.

County Armagh remains officially used for purposes such as a Lieutenancy area – the county retains a lord lieutenant who acts as representative of the British Monarch in the county.

Currently the county is covered for local government purposes by four district councils, namely Armagh City and District Council, most of Craigavon Borough Council, approximately the western third of Newry and Mourne District Council and a part of Dungannon and South Tyrone Borough Council, centred around Peatlands Park.

Armagh ceased to serve as an electoral constituency in 1983, but remains the core of the Newry and Armagh constituency represented at Westminster and the Newry and Armagh constituency represented in the Northern Ireland Assembly. County Armagh also remains as a district for legal and property purposes; however, its baronies no longer have any administrative use.

The -XZ suffix is currently used on vehicle registration plates for vehicles registered in County Armagh. Other suffixes have been -IB and -LZ. These marks are followed by up to four numbers, e.g., JLZ 6789

Settlements

Large towns
(population of 18,000 or more and under 75,000 at 2001 Census)
Newry (though part of the settlement is in County Down)
Craigavon, includes:
Lurgan
Portadown

Medium towns
(population of 10,000 or more and under 18,000 at 2001 Census)
Armagh (has city status)

Small towns
(population of 4,500 or more and under 10,000 at 2001 Census)
none

Intermediate settlements
(population of 2,250 or more and under 4,500 at 2001 Census)
Bessbrook
Keady
Richhill
Tandragee

Villages
(population of 1,000 or more and under 2,250 at 2001 Census)
Crossmaglen
Markethill
Mullavilly/Laurelvale
Poyntzpass (a part of the settlement is in County Down)

Small villages or hamlets
(population of fewer than 1,000 at 2001 Census)
Acton
Annaghmore
Annahugh
Aughanduff
Ardress
Ballymacnab
Bannfoot
Belleeks
Blackwatertown
Bleary
Broomhill
Camlough
Clonmore
Charlemont
Cladymore
Creggan
Cullaville
Cullyhanna
Darkley
Derryadd
Derryhale
Derrymacash
Derrymore
Derrynoose
Derrytrasna
Dorsey
Dromintee
Drumnacanvy
Edenaveys
Forkill
Hamiltonsbawn
Jonesborough
Killean
Killylea
Kilmore
Lislea
Lisnadill
Loughgall
Loughgilly
Madden
Maghery
Meigh
Middletown
Milford
Mountnorris
Mullaghbawn
Mullaghbrack
Mullaghglass
Newtownhamilton
Scotch Street
Silverbridge
Tartaraghan
Tynan
Whitecross

Subdivisions

Baronies

Armagh
Fews Lower
Fews Upper
Oneilland East
Oneilland West
Orior Lower
Orior Upper
Tiranny

Parishes

Townlands

Transport

County Armagh is traversed by two major highways – the M1 linking Belfast to Dungannon crosses the north of the county whilst the A1/N1 from Belfast to Dublin runs in the far south east. Other major roads in the county include the A3 and A29.

Armagh once had a well-developed railway network with connections to, among others, Armagh City, Culloville, Goraghwood, Markethill, Vernersbridge, Tynan (see History of rail transport in Ireland ) but today only Newry (Bessbrook), Portadown, Poyntzpass, Scarva, and Lurgan are served by rail.

There is a possible railway re-opening from Portadown railway station to Armagh railway station in the future. Government Minister for the Department for Regional Development, Danny Kennedy MLA indicates railway restoration plans of the line from Portadown to Armagh.

Ulsterbus provides the most extensive public transport system within the county, including frequent bus transfers daily from most towns to Belfast. Northern Ireland Railways / Iarnród Éireann's Enterprise service provides connections to Dublin in little over an hour and Belfast in little over forty minutes, several times daily.

Inland waterways

County Armagh is traversed by the Ulster Canal and the Newry Canal which are not fully open to navigation.

Sport 
In association football, the NIFL Premiership, which operates as the top division, has one team in the county: Glenavon, with Portadown, Annagh United, Armagh City, Dollingstown, Loughgall and Lurgan Celtic competing in the NIFL Championship, which operates as levels two and three.

The Armagh County Board of the Gaelic Athletic Association or Armagh GAA organises Gaelic games in the county.

People associated with County Armagh
See main article: People from County Armagh
 Frank Aiken (1898–1983), born in County Armagh, Irish Republican, Irish Minister for External Affairs, Tánaiste
 Saint Benignus of Armagh, (d. 467), first rector of the Cathedral School of Armagh and Bishop of Armagh
 Brian Boru (941–1014), buried in Armagh City, victor of Clontarf, High King of Ireland
 George Buchanan Armstrong (1822–1871), born in County Armagh, developed new system of sorting mail on trains in the United States
 Sir Robert Hart (1835–1911), born in County Armagh, second Inspector-General of China's Imperial Maritime Customs Service (IMCS) from 1863 to 1911
 Arthur Hunter Palmer (1819–1898), born in County Armagh, 5th Premier of Queensland
 Samuel Knox (1756–1832), born in County Armagh, Presbyterian clergyman, school principal, and author.
 Tommy Makem (1932–2007), born in County Armagh, singer, musician, and songwriter, often called "The Bard of Armagh".
 Seamus Mallon (1936–2020), born in County Armagh, first deputy First Minister of Northern Ireland
John McCreesh, American politician who served in the Pennsylvania State Senate from 1935 to 1958 was born in Armagh County in 1881.
 Colin Morgan (1986– ), born in County Armagh, actor
 Paul Muldoon (1951– ), born in County Armagh, poet, winner of the Pulitzer Prize for Poetry and the T. S. Eliot Prize
 Tomás Ó Fiaich (1923–1990), born in County Armagh, Cardinal (Catholicism), Catholic Archbishop of Armagh and Primate of All Ireland 1977–90 
 Eunan O'Neill (1982), born in County Armagh, journalist, Russia Today
 Sir William Olpherts (1822–1902), born in County Armagh, soldier and recipient of the Victoria Cross
 Ian Paisley (1926– 2014), born in County Armagh, clergyman, politician, second First Minister of Northern Ireland
 Saint Patrick (fifth century), first Bishop of Armagh
 George William Russell 'Æ' (1867–1919), born in County Armagh, author, critic and painter
 Robert Stewart, Viscount Castlereagh (1759–1822), educated in The Royal School, Armagh. British Foreign Secretary, Secretary for War, Leader of the United Kingdom House of Commons and Chief Secretary for Ireland
 Colin Turkington (1982), born in Portadown, County Armagh, professional racing driver and 2009 British Touring Car champion.
 James Ussher (1581–1656), Church of Ireland Archbishop of Armagh and Primate of All Ireland 1625–1656
 Jim McAllister (1943-2013), Born in Crossmaglen, County Armagh, politician and author.
 Richard Wellesley, 1st Marquess Wellesley (1760–1842), educated in The Royal School, Armagh. Lord Lieutenant of Ireland and Governor General of India
 Andrew Nesbitt (1960), raised in Aughnagurgan, County Armagh, professional rally driver and winner of the 2000 and 2002 Irish Tarmac Rally Championship. Considered one of Irelands top 5 ever drivers.

Places of interest
 Armagh Observatory, founded in 1790 & Armagh Planetarium, a modern working astronomical research institute with a rich heritage
 Armagh Public Library on Abbey Street in Armagh City, especially rich in 17th and 18th century English books, including Dean Jonathan Swift's own copy of the first edition of his Gulliver's Travels with his manuscript corrections
 Navan Fort, now a tree ring mound which once housed the rulers of Ulster with a modern interactive visitor centre
 Saint Patrick's Church of Ireland Cathedral, founded 445, seat of the Church of Ireland's Archbishop of Armagh, Primate of All Ireland, containing the grave of Brian Boru
 Saint Patrick's Roman Catholic Cathedral, commenced in 1838, seat of the Roman Catholic Archbishop of Armagh, Primate of All Ireland, stands on a hill and dominates the local countryside
 Gosford Castle, mock medieval 19th-century castle with substantial grounds
 Slieve Gullion, extinct volcano with crater lake, highest burial cairn in Ireland, views of 9 counties, a Mass rock, and a visitor centre at its foot

Gallery

See also

 Abbeys and priories in Northern Ireland (County Armagh)
 List of Irish counties by area
 List of Irish counties by population
 Lord Lieutenant of Armagh
 High Sheriff of Armagh

References

External links

County Armagh on the interactive map of the counties of Great Britain and Ireland – Wikishire
Armagh and Down tourism
Armagh history
Notes on County Armagh
Selected Monuments in County Armagh
South Armagh – The Myth of Bandit Country

 
Armagh
 
Lord-Lieutenants of Armagh